Letton may refer to the following places in England:
Letton, central Herefordshire
Letton, North Herefordshire
Letton, Norfolk